Róger Daniel Mejía Cortez (born April 30, 1986) is a Nicaraguan footballer who currently plays for Diriangén in the Primera División de Nicaragua.

Club career
He has had a year training in Brazil at Tigres Do Brazil from August 2007. He started his professional career at hometown club América Managua and had a stint with Walter Ferretti before suddenly leaving for the United States in 2011.

In January 2012, Mejía returned to Nicaragua, signing for Diriangén.

International career
Mejía made his debut for Nicaragua in a February 2007 UNCAF Nations Cup match against Guatemala and has, as of December 2013, earned a total of 5 caps, scoring no goals. He has represented his country at the 2007 UNCAF Nations Cup and was a non-playing squad member at the 2009 CONCACAF Gold Cup.

His most recent match was a September 2010 friendly match against Guatemala.

Honors 
Mejía played during the 2009 International Season when Nicaragua reached Round 1 of the Gold Cup.

References

External links

1984 births
Living people
Sportspeople from Managua
Association football defenders
Nicaraguan men's footballers
Nicaragua international footballers
2007 UNCAF Nations Cup players
2009 CONCACAF Gold Cup players
C.D. Walter Ferretti players
Diriangén FC players